"Aquí Estoy Yo" (English: Here I Am) is a song written by Luis Fonsi, Claudia Brant and Gen Rubin; it was produced by Luis Fonsi and Sebastián Krys for Fonsi's seventh studio album Palabras del Silencio (2008), and it is performed by Luis Fonsi, Aleks Syntek, David Bisbal, and Noel Schajris.

It was released as the second single from Fonsi's album on October 13, 2008 and became his sixth number-one single on the Billboard Hot Latin Tracks chart, the second number-one single for David Bisbal on the same chart, and the first for Aleks Syntek and Noel Schajris (as a solo performer).

Background
"Aquí Estoy Yo" was released on October 13, 2008 as the second single from Palabras del Silencio, the seventh studio album recorded by Puerto Rican singer-songwriter Luis Fonsi. This song is the follow-up to "No Me Doy por Vencido" and was written by Fonsi in 2008, according to an interview on the Mexican newspaper El Universal: "I wrote it six years ago to four male voices (the brother of Luis Fonsi and two Brazilian brothers, Rodrigo and Julian Medeiros), and in all these years, I never knew what to do with the song, I thought maybe give it to some group, but as I loved it so much, decided to keep it." About the choice to perform with Noel Schajris, David Bisbal and Aleks Syntek, Fonsi told Billboard magazine: "One day, I thought and I said, why not invite three guys, three friends, not difficult to reach them, they can talk to you one on one, because it had happened but they were my friends." While on a boat fishing with Bisbal, Syntek and Schajris, Fonsi asked them to record the track, since it was "an amazing song and the only thing I do is look at three musketeers sing to me". Fonsi thought that the diversity would help this "hymn": "We have Mexico, Argentina, Spain and Puerto Rico in the same track." During the recording, there were no rules, it was a mix of artistic styles, like a bohemian reunion with friends. On the album review, Jason Birchmeier of AllMusic declared that this was a notable song, that features a quartet of international all-stars.

Music video
The music video was recorded in Mexico City in December 2008, as stated by Fonsi on his official website. It was released on January 26, 2009.

In the music video, Aleks, David, and Noel are all going to meet Fonsi to sing a song together. On their way, there they see Fonsi. When Aleks, David and Noel bump into Ludwika Paleta. When they get to Fonsi’s home, Fonsi, Syntek, Bisbal, and Noel sing "Aquí Estoy Yo" altogether. Near the end, they all leave and see and Fonsi smiles at Ludwika Paleta and she smiles back.

Track listing
Digital download
"Aquí Estoy Yo" (Urban Version) featuring Yomo – 4:28
"Aquí Estoy Yo" (Bachata Version)

Chart performance
The song debuted on the Billboard Hot Latin Tracks chart at number 42 on February 7, 2009. and slowly climbed to number one 19 weeks later, replacing "El Amor" by Tito "El Bambino". The track became Fonsi's sixth number-one single on the chart, and the second number-one single for David Bisbal, after "¿Quién Me Iba a Decir?" in 2006. "Aquí Estoy Yo" became the first number-one single for Aleks Syntek whose previous highest rank on this chart was achieved in 2004 with "Duele el Amor", a duet with Spanish singer Ana Torroja that peaked at number two. It is also the first time that Noel Schajris reached the top position on this chart as a solo performer. With Sin Bandera, Schrajris, reached the number-one position in 2004 with "Mientes Tan Bien".

On the Billboard Latin Pop Airplay chart, this song replaced Fonsi's "No Me Doy por Vencido", which led the list for a chart-record 28 weeks. This was only the third time in the chart's history that an artist has succeeded himself at the top. Juanes' "Gotas de Agua Dulce" followed by "Me Enamora" on the February 23, 2008, and Ricky Martin's "Vuelve" gave way to "Perdido Sin Ti" on September 12, 1998.

Charts

Certifications

Awards

Billboard Latin Music Awards
Latin Pop Airplay Song of the Year
Latin Pop Airplay Artist of the Year – Male

Latin Grammy Awards
Song of the Year

Premio Lo Nuestro
Pop Song of the Year
Collaboration of the Year

References

2008 singles
2008 songs
Aleks Syntek songs
David Bisbal songs
Latin Grammy Award for Song of the Year
Luis Fonsi songs
Noel Schajris songs
Songs written by Claudia Brant
Spanish-language songs
Bachata songs
Universal Music Latino singles
Songs written by Luis Fonsi
2000s ballads
Pop ballads